Shenandoah may refer to:

People
 Senedo people, a Native American tribe in Virginia
 Skenandoa or Shenandoah (1710–1816), Oneida Iroquois chief
 Joanne Shenandoah (1958–2021), Oneida Iroquois singer and acoustic guitarist

Places

United States

Virginia and West Virginia
 Shenandoah, Virginia, a town in the state of Virginia
 Shenandoah County, Virginia, a county in the state of Virginia
 Shenandoah River, a river in Virginia and West Virginia
 Shenandoah Valley, the valley through which the aforementioned river runs 
 Shenandoah Valley AVA, an American Viticultural Area in Virginia and West Virginia
 Shenandoah Mountain, a mountain ridge in Virginia and West Virginia
 Shenandoah National Park, a national park east of the Shenandoah Valley
 Shenandoah Historic District

Other US places
 Shenandoah (Miami), a neighborhood within the city of Miami, Florida
 Shenandoah, Iowa
 Shenandoah, Louisiana
 Shenandoah, New York
 Shenandoah, Pennsylvania
 Shenandoah Creek, a tributary of Mahanoy Creek in Pennsylvania
 Shenandoah, Texas
 Shenandoah, Houston, neighborhood of Houston, Texas
 California Shenandoah Valley AVA, an American Viticultural Area in California
 Shenandoah Peak, in Nevada, US
 Shenandoah station, an historic building located in Shenandoah, Iowa, United States

New Zealand
 Shenandoah River (New Zealand), a river in the South Island
 Shenandoah Highway or State Highway 65, in the South Island

Transportation

Ships
 USS Shenandoah, several ships
 USNS Shenandoah (T-AO-181), an oiler laid down in 1964, renamed USNS Potomac (T-AO-181) 
 CSS Shenandoah, an 1863 Confederate Navy screw steamer
 Shenandoah (schooner), a 1964 topsail schooner run by the Black Dog
 Shenandoah (1902), a schooner built in New York in 1902

Airships
 USS Shenandoah (ZR-1), an American naval rigid airship, broken up in a storm in 1925

Trains
 Shenandoah (B&O train), an American passenger train
 Shenandoah (Amtrak train), an American passenger train between Washington, DC, and Cincinnati, Ohio

Arts and media
 "Oh Shenandoah", an episode of The Newsroom HBO series
 Shenandoah (film), a 1965 film starring Jimmy Stewart
 Shenandoah (musical), a 1974 Broadway musical based on the film
 Shenandoah (magazine), a literary magazine published by Washington and Lee University
 Shenandoah (video game)
 A Man Called Shenandoah, a Western television series

Music
 "Oh Shenandoah", a popular American folk song or sea shanty
 Shenandoah (band), a country music group
 Shenandoah (album), their 1987 self-titled debut album
 Shenandoah, a band formed by Arlo Guthrie
 "Shen-an-doah", the closing song on Pitchshifter's 2002 album PSI

Organizations
 Shenandoah Valley Academy, a parochial, college-preparatory boarding school in New Market, Virginia, US
 Confederate Army of the Shenandoah, during the American Civil War, US
 Union Army of the Shenandoah, during the American Civil War, US
 Shenandoah University, a university in Winchester, Virginia, US
 Museum of the Shenandoah Valley, also in Winchester, Virginia, US

Other uses
 Shenandoah (beard), a type of beard
 Shenandoah Circuit, a race track at Summit Point Motorsports Park, West Virginia, US

See also
 Shenandoah-Dives Mill, a former ore mill
 Operation Shenandoah, a 1966 operation in the Vietnam war
 Army of the Shenandoah (disambiguation)